Pawłowice  is a village in the administrative district of Gmina Teresin, within Sochaczew County, Masovian Voivodeship, in east-central Poland.

The village has a population of 460.

References

Villages in Sochaczew County